Stadhuis is a RandstadRail station in Zoetermeer, the Netherlands.

History

The station opened, as a railway station, on 22 May 1977 as part of the Zoetermeerlijn, operating Zoetermeer Stadslijn services. The station was originally called Centrum Oost in connection with Centrum West station. However this name changed as it could confuse passengers between this station and Zoetermeer Oost station. The station building work didn't finish until 1985, and because of safety concerns, the station was again rebuilt in 1990 to let more sunlight in. The train station closed on 3 June 2006 and reopened as a RandstadRail station on 29 October 2006 for the HTM tram services (4), and on 20 October 2007 for tram service 3.  

The station features 2 underground platforms, located below Zoetermeer's town hall. These platforms are low, and the same level as the tram doors, therefore making it step free.

Train services
The following services currently call at Stadhuis:

Gallery

Railway stations opened in 1977
RandstadRail stations in Zoetermeer